The Journal of Genetics is a peer-reviewed scientific journal in the field of genetics and evolution. It was established in 1910 by the British geneticists William Bateson and Reginald Punnett and is one of the oldest genetics journals. It was later edited by J.B.S. Haldane, who emigrated to India in 1957, and continued publishing the journal from there.

On Haldane's death in 1964, his second wife Helen Spurway continued to publish the journal with Madhav Gadgil, H. Sharat Chandra, and Suresh Jayakar as editors until Spurway died in 1977 and the journal ceased publication. With the permission of Naomi Mitchison, Haldane's sister, it was revived in 1985 and has been published by the Indian Academy of Sciences, currently in collaboration with Springer Science+Business Media, since then. All volumes published between 1910 and 1994 (vol. 1-73) are available free on the website of the Indian Academy of Sciences.

According to the Journal Citation Reports, the journal has a 2019 impact factor of 0.993.

Keeping in pace with the emerging trends in publishing and catering to the requirements of its vast
readership, the Journal of Genetics, has adopted the "Continuous Article Publication" (CAP) mode since 1 January 2019.

References

External links

 

Publications established in 1910
Genetics journals
English-language journals
Springer Science+Business Media academic journals
Quarterly journals